Theophanes Chrysobalantes, erroneously known as Theophanes Nonnus or Nonnos in older scholarship, was a Byzantine physician who wrote an outline of medicine dedicated to Emperor Constantine VII Porphyrogennetos.

Identity
The extant manuscripts identify the author as Theophanes; the name Nonnus was apparently fabricated by the 16th-century copyist Andreas Darmarios. The name Chrysobalantes was either an epithet or a variant of the documented Byzantine family name Chrysobalantites. Some copies of the manuscripts are anonymous or identify the author incorrectly as Michael Psellos.

Theophanes was likely a physician himself. Two works reference him as their author:
 An outline of past medical treatises with some original material by Chrysobalantes himself, known by the Latin title 
 A treatise on diet, known as 

In addition, an anonymous outline on medical cures is likely part of his work, on account of similarities in the preface with those of the other two works, as well as the thematical coherence the whole represents.

See also
 Nonnus (disambiguation), for other people named Nonnus

References

Sources
 
 

10th-century Byzantine physicians
10th-century Byzantine writers
Medical literature
Medical writers